Cipada is a village in the district Cikalongwetan, West Bandung Regency, West Java, Indonesia.

Villages in District Cikalongwetan 
 Cikalong
 Cipada
 Ciptagumati
 Cisomang Barat
 Ganjarsari
 Kanangasari
 Mandalamukti
 Mandalasari
 Mekarjaya
 Puteran
 Rende
 Tenjolaut
 Wangunjaya

References

Villages in West Java